Epping and Ongar Rural District was a rural district in the county of Essex, England from 1955 to 1974.

Creation
It was created in 1955 by the merger of the disbanded Ongar Rural District and most of the disbanded Epping Rural District, except the civil parishes of Great Parndon, Harlow, Latton, Little Parndon and Netteswell, which were largely transferred to the newly created Harlow Urban District reflecting its new town status. The Epping and Ongar administration was based in Epping.

List of parishes

Abolition
At the time of its dissolution it consisted of 29 civil parishes. Since 1 April 1974 it has formed part of the District of Epping Forest, except for the civil parishes of Blackmore, Doddinghurst, Kelvedon Hatch, Navestock and Stondon Massey, which became part of the Borough of Brentwood.

See also
 Epping Ongar Railway

References

Political history of Essex
Epping Forest District
Borough of Brentwood
Districts of England abolished by the Local Government Act 1972